The 1910 Giro d'Italia was the second edition of the Giro d'Italia, one of cycling's Grand Tours. The field consisted of 101 riders, and 20 riders finished the race.

By rider

References

1910 Giro d'Italia
1910